Smirnenkoye is a rural locality (a selo) in Semyonovsky Selsoviet, Kulundinsky District, Altai Krai, Russia. The population was 316 as of 2013. There are 3 streets.

Geography 
Smirnenkoye is located 24 km east of Kulunda (the district's administrative centre) by road. Semyonovka is the nearest rural locality.

References 

Rural localities in Kulundinsky District